Ian Campbell Aitken MacDonald (born 30 August 1953) is a former professional footballer who played as a central defender, making over 300 career appearances.

Career
Born in Rinteln, West Germany, MacDonald played for Elgin City, St Johnstone, Carlisle United, Dundee and Arbroath.

Notes

References

1953 births
Living people
Scottish footballers
Elgin City F.C. players
St Johnstone F.C. players
Carlisle United F.C. players
Dundee F.C. players
Arbroath F.C. players
Scottish Football League players
English Football League players
Scotland under-23 international footballers
Association football central defenders